LMSR may refer to:

London, Midland and Scottish Railway, a former British railway company (1923-1947)
Large, Medium-Speed Roll-on/Roll-off, several classes of Military Sealift Command (MSC) roll-on/roll-off type cargo ships.